The American Breast Cancer Foundation is a charitable organization focused on breast cancer prevention. Based in Columbia, Maryland, the organization provides early detection, education and screening services.

An article by the Tampa Bay Times in 2013, listing the foundation for its use of professional fundraisers, was unaware the foundation terminated all relationships with professional telemarketers by 2011.

Although ABCF received a lower-than-desirable rating from Charity Navigator, (primarily due to telemarketing costs and business procedures in effect prior to 2010 under different management), the foundation maintains that its poor showing was based on old data for practices it no longer engages in.

Since its complete restructuring beginning in 2010, ABCF has made impressive gains in securing funding for its programs, relying only on events fundraising, private donations, and corporate donations. Between January 2012 and March 2014, ABCF received dollars from every state in the nation, Puerto Rico, and three foreign countries.

In 2014, ABCF was awarded a Gold Level Rating by the GuideStar Exchange for its significant gains to implement a best practice model.

References

External links

Non-profit organizations based in Maryland
Breast cancer organizations
Organizations established in 1997